Pitar albidus, or the white venus clam, is a species of bivalve mollusc in the family Veneridae. It can be found along the coast of the West Indies.

References

Pitar
Bivalves described in 1791
Taxa named by Johann Friedrich Gmelin